Sodini is a surname. Notable people with the surname include:

Dante Sodini (1858–1934), Italian sculptor
George Sodini (1960–2009)
Peter J. Sodini, American businessman
Pierre-François Sodini (born 1989), French footballer
Simona Sodini (born 1982), Italian footballer
Italian-language surnames